39 may refer to: 
 39 (number), the natural number following 38 and preceding 40
 one of the years:
 39 BC
 AD 39
 1939
 2039
 39 (album), a 2000 studio album by Mikuni Shimokawa
 '39", a 1975 song by Queen
 "Thirty Nine", a song by Karma to Burn from the album Almost Heathen, 2001
 Thirty-Nine, a 2022 South Korean television series